Neochori Lykosouras is a village in the municipality of Megalopoli, Arcadia, Greece. It is situated on a hillside overlooking the Alfeios river valley, at about 490 m elevation. It is 3 km north of Paradeisia, 3 km southwest of Tripotamo, 5 km southeast of Isaris and 8 km southwest of Megalopoli. In 2011 Neochori had a population of 49.

Population

See also
List of settlements in Arcadia

References

External links
 Neochori Lykosoura GTP Travel Pages

Megalopolis, Greece
Populated places in Arcadia, Peloponnese